Carl Erik Friman, better known by his stage name Fricky (born 9 March 1992), is a Swedish rapper and musician. In 2018, he released his debut EP Aqua Aura, which peaked at number five on the Swedish Albums Chart. The EP contained songs like "Aqua Aura" and "Hon Få Mig", with the first being certified platinum in Sweden. "Hon få mig" was released as a remix, that featured Ozzy, Leslie Tay and Blizzy. It was subsequently certified platinum in Sweden as well.

Career 
Fricky started doing hip-hop in his hometown of Umeå (often referred in his music as UÅ) with his friend Johan Bäckström (Broder John) and they made an album together called Mauro, which was released under the name "Broder John & Friman". They also co-founded the record label Hoopdiggas.  Friman released the song "Hon få mig" in 2017 which became a hit in Sweden that later paved the way for his EP Aqua Aura, which was released in 2018. Aqua Aura featured songs as "Mästerort", "Je T'aime" and "Aqua Aura". The latter became one of the most streamed songs on Spotify in Sweden that year. Majority of the songs from the EP was produced by fellow collective artist and close friend Academics. The EP also charted for 82 weeks in Sweden, peaking at number 5 on the Swedish Albums Chart. Subsequently, Fricky was given the award for Artist of the Year from P3 Guld 2019. Fricky released the single "Kungsliften", featuring Cherrie, in 2018. The song peaked at number 54 on the Swedish Singles Chart. He has also been featured on numerous tracks; "Cali" (with Näääk and Denz), "Flyger Högt" (by BENNETT) and "Chocolate" (by K27). "Cali" peaked at number 18 on the Swedish Singles Chart. He has released three solo singles in 2020, "Beemer" and "Axlar", with the first peaking at number 41 on the Swedish Singles Chart. "Axlar" charted on the Swedish Heatseeker Chart, where it peaked at number six. The third single, "Kär Pt. 2", was released on 10 July. It marks the follow-up to Fricky's single "Kär Pt. 1", released in 2016.

Personal life 
Friman is married to Swedish rapper Cleo, who gave birth to their daughter Elda in early 2019.

Discography
Adapted from Spotify.

Studio albums
 Fricktion (2021) – No. 7 Sweden

Extended plays

Singles

Other charted songs

Featured singles

Notes

References 

Living people
1992 births
Swedish hip hop musicians
Swedish pop singers
Swedish songwriters
Swedish-language singers
People from Umeå
21st-century Swedish singers
21st-century Swedish male singers
Musikförläggarnas pris winners